The American International School Muscat (TAISM) is an American curriculum international school in Muscat, Oman, serving early childhood through high school. Established in 1998, it is the sole American-only curriculum school in Oman.

, the school had 720 students which came from 62 other countries.

TAISM is a member of the SAISA League.

Notable alumni
Safiya al Bahlani, Omani artist and disability rights activist
Tate McRae, Canadian singer-songwriter and dancer

References

External links

 The American International School Muscat

1998 establishments in Oman
Educational institutions established in 1998
American international schools in Asia
International schools in Oman
Schools in Muscat, Oman